Sydnes is a traditional neighbourhood in the city of Bergen in Vestland county, Norway.  It is located along the Puddefjorden in the southern part of the city centre of Bergen. TV 2 has its headquarters at Sydnes.  The Johanneskirken is located in this neighborhood.

References

Traditional neighbourhoods of Bergen

no:Sydnes (Bergen)